Tropicoptinus latefasciatus is a beetle species in the family Ptinidae.

References

Ptinus
Beetles described in 1883